Ladies' aid societies or soldiers' aid societies were organizations of women formed during the American Civil War that were dedicated to providing supplies to soldiers on the battlefield and caring for sick and wounded soldiers. Over the course of the war, between 7,000 and 20,000 ladies' aid societies were established.  The work these women did in providing sanitary supplies and blankets to soldiers helped lessen the spread of diseases during the Civil War. In the North, their work was supported by the U.S. Sanitary Commission. At the end of the war, many ladies' aid societies in the South transformed into memorial associations. Free black women often formed their own ladies' aid societies, like the Colored Ladies Soldiers' Aid Society of St. Louis, Missouri, headed by Mary Meachum, which tended to black Union soldiers at the local hospital.

The Sanitary Commission
Although war causes many casualties, for every one man that died during the Civil War, two people died from disease. Dysentery, diarrhea, typhoid and malaria were all diseases caused by the overcrowdedness and unsanitary conditions during the war. People began addressing the importance of having clean water, clean food, and fresh air to breathe. Women decided to take initiative. They began collecting food, clothing, medicine, or anything usable for the soldiers in need. However, the women had an issue—they were not sure how they would be able to deliver the supplies to the soldiers. They held a conference in New York for all the doctors, lawyers, and clergymen interested in helping the soldiers. The result of this event led to the formation of the Sanitary Commission. The sanitation was organized, run, and supplied by the civilians.

Soldiers' Aid Society of Northern Ohio
At the Ladies’ Aid Society a group of women from Cleveland met and organized a "blanket raid" to collect blankets for the troops of soldiers. Months after the women organized the raid, they connected with other local groups to create the Soldiers' Aid Society. The organization was financed by private donations to care for the sick and wounded. They provided hospital service, food, clothing, and medical supplies. They established their distribution center at 95 Bank (W. 6th) St. From February 22 to March 10, 1864, the women from the Soldiers' Aid Society held a Sanitation Fair. The fair was organized to raise money to help soldiers during the Civil War.

After the Civil War
When the war was over, soldiers who came home were still in need of medical care, so many ladies' aid societies continued to support hospitals and war veterans. As they volunteered, women picked up nursing skills and some of them continued into nursing careers after the war.

References

Further reading
 Attie, Rejean (1998). Patriotic Toil: Northern Women and the American Civil War.
 Massey, Mary Elizabeth (1996). Women in the Civil War.
 Scott, Anne Firor (1993). Natural Allies: Women's Associations in American History, chapter 3.

External links
 How Ladies' Aid Societies Worked
 Bloomington Grove Ladies Aid Collection, McLean County Museum of History

Cultural history of the American Civil War
History of women in the United States
Women in the American Civil War